Bobby Ray Phills II (December 20, 1969 – January 12, 2000) was an American professional basketball player. He played shooting guard and small forward for the National Basketball Association's Cleveland Cavaliers and Charlotte Hornets.

A native of Baton Rouge, Louisiana, Phills attended Baton Rouge's Southern University. He was a member of Alpha Phi Alpha. He was selected by the Milwaukee Bucks in the 1991 NBA draft (45th overall).

After being cut in December 1991 without playing a game for the Bucks, Phills had a stint with the Sioux Falls Skyforce of the Continental Basketball Association before being signed by the Cavaliers and rejoining the NBA late in the 1991–92 season. Over his nine-year career, he averaged 11.0 points, 3.1 rebounds, and 2.7 assists per game. He was known as a defensive stopper, averaging 1.3 steals per game for his career, and an excellent perimeter shooter, with a 39.0% career three-point shooting percentage.

College
Phills attended Southern University in Baton Rouge, Louisiana, and was a member of the Alpha Phi Alpha fraternity. He led the NCAA in three-point field goals per game (4.39) his senior year.

Professional career

Cleveland Cavaliers

Charlotte Hornets

Player profile
Though he made a name for himself as a shooter during his college career, Phills became known as a tenacious wing defender in the NBA. At 6' 5" and 220 pounds, he was said to more resemble an NFL linebacker than a basketball player. In 1996, Michael Jordan remarked that Phills was the toughest defender he had ever faced.

Death
On January 12, 2000, while a member of the Charlotte Hornets, Phills was killed in a car accident in Charlotte, North Carolina. Phills was traveling behind teammate David Wesley at over  when his Porsche spun and crossed into oncoming traffic. It hit another car, which in turn was struck in the rear by a minivan. The drivers of the other two vehicles recovered, while Phills was pronounced dead at the scene. A police report said Phills and Wesley were driving "in an erratic, reckless, careless, negligent or aggressive manner." Wesley was later convicted of reckless driving after being cleared of a racing charge.

Personal life

Phills was survived by his parents, his wife Kendall, and three children; a daughter Brittany Dickson, a son Bobby Ray Phills III, known as Trey and a daughter Kerstie.  Trey gained statewide recognition in North Carolina while playing for Charlotte Christian School. He played college basketball for the  Yale Bulldogs and now plays for the Greensboro Swarm of the NBA G League. After starting her college career at Wagner, Kerstie transferred and is currently a redshirt sophomore for Florida Gulf Coast University.

Legacy

The Hornets retired Phills' #13 jersey on February 9, 2000, during halftime of a game vs. Phills' former team, the Cavaliers. It was the first number that the Hornets franchise had ever retired. Phills' Hornets teammates also wore a patch bearing his' #13 on their jerseys for the remainder of the 1999–2000 season. His jersey hung from the rafters of the Charlotte Coliseum until the franchise relocated to New Orleans in 2002; it was then displayed in the New Orleans Arena until 2013. In 2004, the NBA added an expansion team, the Charlotte Bobcats. After the New Orleans team re-branded themselves as the New Orleans Pelicans - thereby relinquishing the Hornets name and their previous history in Charlotte - the Bobcats became the Hornets and merged the team's past tenures into a new history for the franchise. On November 1, 2014, the newly renamed team re-honored his jersey; it currently hangs from the rafters of the Spectrum Center.

See also

 List of basketball players who died during their careers
 List of NCAA Division I men's basketball season 3-point field goal leaders

References

External links
 
 Stats at Basketball-Reference.com
 Hornets 24/7/2009 Remembrance Article

1969 births
2000 deaths
African-American basketball players
American expatriate basketball people in Spain
American men's basketball players
Basketball players from Baton Rouge, Louisiana
Burials in Louisiana
CB Zaragoza players
Charlotte Hornets players
Cleveland Cavaliers players
Liga ACB players
Milwaukee Bucks draft picks
National Basketball Association players with retired numbers
Road incident deaths in North Carolina
Shooting guards
Sioux Falls Skyforce (CBA) players
Small forwards
Southern Jaguars basketball players
20th-century African-American sportspeople